Korean has at least two translations of the Tirukkural available as of 2017.

History of translations
When Shuzo Matsunaga made the first Japanese translation of the Kural text in 1981, he also translated it into Korean, thus making it the first translation of the Kural literature into Korean. In 2015, the then Chief Minister of Tamil Nadu, J. Jayalalithaa, announced the allocation of  3.6 million towards translating the Kural text into Korean. The translation was released by the Chief Minister of Tamil Nadu K. Palaniswami on 23 May 2017. The first copy of the translation was received by Consul General of the Republic of Korea in Chennai Kim Hyung Tae.

Translations

See also
 Tirukkural translations
 List of Tirukkural translations by language

References 

Korean
Translations into Korean